The Illawarra Rugby League is a rugby league competition in Wollongong, NSW. It is one of the oldest rugby league competitions in Australia, founded in 1911 with five clubs (Dapto, Helensburgh, Mount Keira, Unanderra and Wollongong). The area provides a nursery of juniors for the Illawarra Steelers and St George Illawarra Dragons. The season is contested by seven teams and concludes with a finals series involving the top four teams.

History
Only the Northern parts of the Illawarra have traditionally been included in this competition, with teams further south playing in Group 7. However, Shellharbour's decision in 2009 to field a team in the NSW Cup was coupled with a decision to play in the Illawarra Rugby League as well, blurring the boundary between the two competitions. Other Group 7 clubs are fielding teams in the lower leagues of Illawarra competitions and there's a possibility the two competitions may merge.

The Illawarra Division is one of the strongest, along with Newcastle, local competition in New South Wales. The league features many former and current NRL players and also National Youth Competition players. The Illawarra Division Senior representative team are two-time National Country champions and have won the Country Rugby League championships consistently. The Division also supplies players to the NSWRL Harold Matthews and SG Ball Cup competitions.

On 21 July 2011, whilst celebrating their centenary, Illawarra Rugby League announced their "Team of the Century". Immortals Graeme Langlands and Bob Fulton featured at fullback and five-eighth respectively, as well as Harry Wells at centre. The entire team follows:

Teams
The following table lists the clubs and the teams fielded in the 2022 senior competitions: Mojo Homes Illawarra Cup - NSWRL President's Cup Southern Conference (PC), Division 1 (Div1), Division 2 (Div2), Under 18s (U18), Women's tackle (Wom), Ladies League Tag (LLT). The table also indicates whether the club has junior teams.

Map

Former clubs

First Grade 
Clubs with at least one season in 1st Grade
  Albion Park (1926–31 lower grades, 1934–37 1st Grade)
  Army (1942–43 1st & 2nd grade)
  Bombo (1925–27)
  Bulli (1926 1st grade, 1927–31 lower grades)
  Cronulla-Caringbah Sharks (2022 1st grade)
  Diggers (1919 2nd grade, 1920–21 1st grade)
  Gerringong (1925–27)
  Jamberoo (1928–30)
  Kiama (1926 3rd grade, 1927–28 1st grade)
  Mount Keira (1912–13, 1920, 1924-28, 1932-39, 1945-48 (as Unanderra-Kiera)  1st grade; 1914 & 1919 2nd grades, 1922–23 lower grades, 1929–31 lower grades, 1940–44 lower grades) – Formally merged to form Western Suburbs Red Devils in 1949
  Main Roads Board (1927)
  North Wollongong (1931 1st grade, 1923–24 3rd grade)
   Scarborough (1938–40 1st grade, 1920–21 & 1941–46 lower grades)
  Services (1942–43 1st grade; a separate team from Army)
  Shellharbour Sharks (2009–13 1st grade; 1928, 1930 & 1944 lower grades)
  Unanderra (1912–14, 1919–21, 1923, 1926–30, 1945–48 (as Unanderra-Keira); 1922, 1924–25, 1932–33, 1944 lower grades) – Formally merged to form Western Suburbs Red Devils in 1949
  University of Wollongong (Books 1988–2005 1st grade; Titans 2009 3rd grade, 2010–11 1st grade; 1975–76 Division 2). Also known as the Lighthouse Keepers. Plan to return in 2024.
  Wentworthville Magpies (1975–77)
  West Wollongong (1921–24 lower grades, 1925–26 1st grade, 1927–28 lower grades, 1929–35 1st grade)
 Wollongong (1912; Buccaneers 1913–14, 1919–24; Glebe 1921–23 lower grades, 1924–28 1st grade; 1929–71 1st grade; Wolves 1972–88 1st grade; Bulls 1997 lower grades, 1998–2005 1st grade; Wollongong-University Bulls joint venture 2006–08 1st grade)

Lower Grades only 
Clubs or teams that participated in two or more seasons are listed below. Participants in the Amateur Rugby League (1982–87) are included.
 Albion Park Outlaws (1991–97, 2010–13)
 Austinmeer (1997–99)
 Balgownie Tigers (1913–14, 1921–22, 1944–52, 1973–93)
 Baxters Goannas (1991–93)
 Bellambi (1997–2002)
 Bomaderry Swamp Rats (2016–18 Women)
 Bulli Hotel Colts (1989–95, 2005–09)
 Cabbage Tree Hotel (1994)
 Coniston (1931–33)
 Fairy Meadow Chargers (1972–90)
 Guinerys Goannas (1979–90)
 Harp Angels (1986-91; Harp Hares 2003)
 Illawarra All Blacks (1992–93)
 Imperial Hotel Knights (1991–94)
 Kiama Surf Bees (1988–92)
 Lakeview Bears (1989–95)
 Open Hearth Hotel (1975–78)
 North Wollongong Surf (1972–79, 2009–14)
 Ryans Hotel (1981–83 Roos, 1985–87 Colts)
 Shellharbour Barracudas (1996–97)
 South Pacific Lions (1981–82)
 Tech (1944–54 Under 18/19 & 16/17 teams)
 The Blues (Berkeley, 1997–99)
 Unanderra Falcons (1981–97)
 Welcome Inn (1995 Knights, 1996 Steamers)

First Grade Premiers
Tip: To view original newspaper articles on matches up to 1954, hover over the blue number in the Reports column and then click on the article name. That will open the article in Trove.

Women's Opens Premiership

See also

Rugby League Competitions in Australia
Rugby league in New South Wales

References

External links and Sources
 First grade ladder – from Sporting Pulse site
 Illawarra RL on Country Rugby League's official site
 Trove Digitised Newspapers
 Rugby League Week at State Library of NSW Research and Collections

Sport in Wollongong
Rugby league competitions in New South Wales
Recurring sporting events established in 1911
1911 establishments in Australia
Sports leagues established in 1911